The Frail Tide is the first studio album by Australian melodic death metal band, Be'lakor, released on 21 April 2007.

Track listing

References

2007 albums
Be'lakor albums